Zing Technologies is company that marketed a proprietary collaborative software system for meeting and learning. There are two versions of their software, Anyzing and Zingthing.

See also 
Computer-supported collaboration
Online learning

References 
 Elliot, A., Findlay, J., Fitzgerald, R.N. & Forster, A. (2004). Transforming pedagogies using collaborative tools. World Conference on Educational Multimedia, Hypermedia and Telecommunications 2004(1), 2565-2569. .
 Elliott, A. (2002). Scaffolding knowledge building strategies in teacher education settings. In Crawford, C., Willis, D., Carlsen, R., Gibson, I., McFerrin, K., Price, J., & Weber, R. (Eds.), Proceedings of Society for Information Technology and Teacher Education International Conference 2002 (pp. 827–829). Chesapeake, VA: AACE.
 Fitzgerald, R.N., & Findlay, J. (2004). A computer-based research tool for rapid knowledge-creation. Cantoni, L. and McLoughlin, C. (eds) World Conference on Educational Multimedia, Hypermedia and Telecommunications 2004(1), 1979-1984. .
 Moyle, Kathryn. (2006). Focus groups in educational research: using ICT to assist in meaningful data collection. AARE Conference Paper Abstracts - 2006, 
 Whymark, G., Callan, J., & Purnell, K. (2004, November 24). Online learning predicates teamwork: Collaboration underscores student engagement. Studies in Learning, Evaluation, Innovation and Development [Online], 1(2).
 Willcox, J & Zuber-Skerritt, O. (2003). Using the Zing team learning system (TLS) as an electronic method for the Nominal Group Technique (NGT). ALAR Journal, 8(1), 61-75.

Groupware